The 1990 NCAA Division II men's basketball tournament involved 32 schools playing in a single-elimination tournament to determine the national champion of men's NCAA Division II college basketball as a culmination of the 1989-90 NCAA Division II men's basketball season. It was won by Kentucky Wesleyan College, with Wade Green of runner-up California State University, Bakersfield named the Most Outstanding Player.

Regional participants

*denotes tie

Regionals

New England - Manchester, New Hampshire 
Location: NHC Fieldhouse Host: New Hampshire College

Third Place - New Hampshire College 91, New Haven 88

West - Bakersfield, California 
Location: CSUB Student Activities Center Host: California State University, Bakersfield

Third Place - Humboldt State 71, UC Riverside 70

East - Erie, Pennsylvania 
Location: Hammermill Center Host: Gannon University

Third Place - C.W. Post 84, Slippery Rock 79

South Atlantic - Norfolk, Virginia 
Location: Joseph G. Echols Memorial Hall Host: Norfolk State University

Third Place - Norfolk State 102, Virginia Union 93

South Central - Cape Girardeau, Missouri 
Location: Show Me Center Host: Southeast Missouri State University

Third Place - West Texas State 98, Southern Indiana 92*

Great Lakes - Owensboro, Kentucky 
Location: Owensboro Sportscenter Host: Kentucky Wesleyan College

Third Place - Ferris State 88, Southwest Baptist 80*

North Central - Grand Forks, North Dakota 
Location: Hyslop Sports Center Host: University of North Dakota

Third Place - South Dakota 101, Alaska–Anchorage 92

South - Lakeland, Florida 
Location: Jenkins Field House Host: Florida Southern College

Third Place - Florida Southern 92, Tampa 82

*denotes each overtime played

Elite Eight - Springfield, Massachusetts
Location: Springfield Civic Center Hosts: American International College and Springfield College

Third Place - North Dakota 98, Morehouse 77
*denotes each overtime played

All-tournament team
 Corey Crowder (Kentucky Wesleyan)
 LeRoy Ellis (Kentucky Wesleyan)
 Wade Green (Cal State Bakersfield)
 Vincent Mitchell (Kentucky Wesleyan)
 Dave Vonesh (North Dakota)

See also
1990 NCAA Division I men's basketball tournament
1990 NCAA Division III men's basketball tournament
1990 NAIA men's basketball tournament
1990 NCAA Division II women's basketball tournament

References
 1990 NCAA Division II men's basketball tournament jonfmorse.com

External links
 NCAA record book

NCAA Division II men's basketball tournament
Tournament
NCAA Division II basketball tournament
NCAA Division II basketball tournament